Baud may refer to:

Baud, symbols per second or pulses per second

People:
Alf Baud (1892–1986), Australian rules footballer
Auguste Baud-Bovy (1848–1949), Swiss painter
Frédéric Baud (born 1975), French Nordic combined skier who competed from 1993 to 2004
Jean Baud (businessman) (1919–2012), French businessman
Jean Chrétien Baud (1789–1859), Governor-General of the Dutch East Indies from 1833 until 1836
Jean-Jacques Baud (born 1947), French former sports shooter
Marcelle Baud (1890–1987), French Egyptologist and artist 
Michel Baud (1963–2012),  French Egyptologist, head of the Nubian Sudan section in the Department of Egyptian Antiquities of the Louvre Museum

Places:
Baud, Morbihan, commune in the Morbihan département in Brittany in north-western France

See also
Musée Baud, music-box museum in the Swiss village of L'Auberson in the Jura Mountains in the canton of Vaud
Émile Baudot (1845–1903), French engineer and inventor, after whom the telecommunications unit of baud is named